Panclintis socia is a moth of the family Agonoxenidae, and is the single species of its genus. It is found in Colombia.

References

Moths described in 1929
Agonoxeninae
Moths of South America